Gundula Janowitz (born 2 August 1937) is an Austrian lyric soprano singer of operas, oratorios, lieder, and concerts. She is one of the most renowned opera singers of the 20th century and was pre-eminent in the 1960s and 1970s.

Career
Janowitz was born in Berlin, but grew up in Graz, Austria, where she became a naturalised Austrian. She studied at the Graz Conservatory in Austria, and had already begun to sing at the highest level by the end of the 1950s (Haydn's The Creation, with Herbert von Karajan in 1960). In 1959, Karajan engaged her as Barbarina in Mozart's The Marriage of Figaro at the Vienna State Opera, of which she became a permanent member in 1962. 

During the 1960s and 1970s, Janowitz became one of the most popular singers in her field internationally and she developed a comprehensive discography of works ranging from Bach to Richard Strauss. Those eminent conductors with whom she performed included Karajan, but also Otto Klemperer, Eugen Jochum, Leonard Bernstein, Rafael Kubelík, Karl Böhm, Georg Solti, and Carlos Kleiber.

One of the emphases of Janowitz's work was the development of song recitals, which she gave several times at the Salzburg Festival. Following her vocal career, she was active as a vocal teacher. In 1990, she temporarily took over the position of Opera Director in Graz.

Janowitz appeared on many of the great stages of the world, including the Glyndebourne Festival Opera, the Bayreuth Festival, the Salzburg Easter Festival, the Metropolitan Opera, the Paris Opera, La Scala and the Royal Opera House. In 1980, she sang the part of the Countess in a now legendary new production of The Marriage of Figaro (with Georg Solti as conductor, Giorgio Strehler as director and Ezio Frigerio as set designer). Her recording of Schubert's Lieder for female voice has been twice awarded Germany's Deutscher Schallplattenpreis.

She kept singing Lieder recitals until 1997, when she completely retired from performing. As well as being an honorary member of the Vienna State Opera and of the Academy of Music in Graz, she was appointed an honorary member of the Royal Academy of Music in London in 2000.

Voice and repertory
Janowitz's voice is recognizable by its pure, "creamy" tone, and rapid vibrato.  Like her predecessor Maria Stader, who had similar timbre to hers, and like her contemporary, Elizabeth Harwood, Janowitz mastered first and foremost the high and middle register and lyrical-emotional expression. Despite her comparatively weak sound projection, she occasionally performed in dramatic roles (Sieglinde, Leonore, Elsa) or comic roles (Marzelline, Rosalinde), but she was most highly regarded as Fiordiligi, Countess Rosina Almaviva, Pamina, Agathe, Arabella, Ariadne, Countess Madeleine, and in sacred music (the Angel Gabriel, The Creation). Of her interpretation of Four Last Songs by Richard Strauss, David Bowie wrote: "Although Eleanor Steber and Lisa Della Casa do fine interpretations of this monumental work, Janowitz’s performance [...] has been described, rightly, as transcendental. It aches with love for a life that is quietly fading. I know of no other piece of music, nor any performance, which moves me quite like this." With a few exceptions, she avoided foreign-language roles (although recordings exist of her singing Don Carlos and Verdi's Requiem and all three Mozart/DaPonte operas in Italian). An excerpt of her portrayal of the Figaro Countess in the duettino "Canzonetta sull'aria" with Swiss soprano Edith Mathis features prominently in the 1994 film The Shawshank Redemption.

Selected discography
 With Otto Klemperer: The Magic Flute
 With Herbert von Karajan: The Creation, The Seasons, Die Walküre, Götterdämmerung, St Matthew Passion, Mass in B minor, Fidelio (as Marzelline), Ninth Symphony, Missa solemnis, A German Requiem, Four Last Songs
 With Bernard Haitink, Four Last Songs
 With Leonard Bernstein: Fidelio (as Leonore)
 With Eugen Jochum: Carmina Burana
 With Carlos Kleiber: Der Freischütz
 With Karl Böhm: Così fan tutte, The Marriage of Figaro, Die Fledermaus, The Seasons, Capriccio
 With Jeffrey Tate: Don Giovanni (as Donna Elvira)
 With Rafael Kubelík: Die Meistersinger von Nürnberg, Lohengrin
 With Rudolf Kempe: Ariadne auf Naxos
 With Karl Richter: Christmas Oratorio, Messiah, Orfeo ed Euridice
 With Hans Knappertsbusch: Parsifal (1962, as Flower Girl)
 With Helmut Koch: Judas Maccabaeus
 With Ferdinand Leitner: Armida
 With Wilfried Boettcher: Mozart: Concert Arias, Georg Philipp Telemann: Ino (Dramatic Cantata)
 Lieder by Franz Schubert, with Charles Spencer (piano)
 Lieder by Franz Schubert, with Irwin Gage (piano). Includes "Gretchen am Spinnrade", "Die Männer sind méchant", and "Der Hirt auf dem Felsen"
 Das Marienleben, Op.27, by Paul Hindemith, with Irwin Gage (piano).

Filmography
Concerts
 Gundula Janowitz: In Concert (recorded live) (1970, conductor Berislav Klobučar, Video Artists International Inc.)
 Beethoven Symphony No. 9 in D minor, Op.125 "Choral" (1968, conductor/director Herbert von Karajan, Unitel Classica)
 Bach Mass in B minor BWV 232 (1969, conductor Karl Richter; director Arne Arbom, Unitel Classica)
 Mozart Requiem K.626 (1971, conductor Karl Böhm; director Hugo Käch, Unitel Classica)
 Brahms Ein Deutsches Requiem, op.45 (1978, conductor/director Herbert von Karajan, Unitel Classica)

Operas
 Così fan tutte (1969, conductor Karl Böhm; director Václav Kašlík, Unitel Classica) 
 Die Fledermaus (1972, conductor Karl Böhm; director Otto Schenk, Unitel Classica)
 Arabella (1977, conductor Sir Georg Solti; director Otto Schenk, Unitel Classica)
 Fidelio (1977, conductor Zubin Mehta; director Pierre Jourdan, Gaumont Distribution)
 Ariadne auf Naxos (1978, conductor, Karl Böhm; director John Vernon, Unitel Classica)
 Fidelio (1978, conductor, Leonard Bernstein; director Otto Schenk, Deutsche Grammophon)

Decorations and awards
 Kammersängerin (Austria, 1969; Berlin, 1974)
 1978 Joseph Marx Music Prize of the State of Styria
 2000 Austrian Cross of Honour for Science and Art, 1st class
 2003 Gold Medal for services to the City of Vienna
 Grand Gold Decoration of Styria
 2019 Hugo-Wolf-Award

References

External links
Website about Janowitz archived on 2014-12-27

Complete discography
Cast list of Janowitz' final opera performance, Ariadne auf Naxos, Vienna State Opera, 18 May 1990
Excerpts from her final recital, given in 1999
 Recording of Le nozze di Figaro at the  Kleines Festspielhaus in Salzburg 1971 in the 

Online Archive of the Österreichische Mediathek  Retrieved 7. November 2022

1937 births
Living people
Musicians from Graz
Singers from Berlin
Lieder singers
Naturalised citizens of Austria
Austrian operatic sopranos
Österreichischer Kammersänger
University of Music and Performing Arts Graz alumni
Honorary Members of the Royal Academy of Music
Recipients of the Austrian Cross of Honour for Science and Art, 1st class
20th-century Austrian women opera singers
Deutsche Grammophon artists